Ras El Oued may refer to:
Ras El Oued, Algeria
Ras El Oued, Morocco
Ras El Oued District in Algeria

See also
Ras el Oued, a town in Taounate Province, Morocco